Kunath is a German surname. Notable people with the surname include:

Friedrich Kunath (born 1974), German artist
Hanna Kunath (1909–1994), German pilot
Jens Kunath (born 1967), German footballer

German-language surnames